Angelika Bunse-Gerstner (born 1951) is a German mathematician specializing in numerical linear algebra and control theory.

Education and career
Bunse-Gerstner earned her Ph.D. from Bielefeld University in 1978. Her dissertation, Der HR-Algorithmus zur numerischen Bestimmung der Eigenwerte einer Matrix, was jointly supervised by Ludwig Elsner and Hans Johnen.

Until 2017, Bunse-Gerstner was head of the Numerics group in the Zentrum für Technomathematik (ZeTeM) at the University of Bremen.

Book
Bunse-Gerstner is the author of a German-language textbook on numerical linear algebra, Numerische lineare Algebra (with Wolfgang Bunse, Teubner Mathematical Textbooks, 1985).

Recognition
In 2017, the Society for Industrial and Applied Mathematics listed Bunse-Gerstner as a Fellow, "for contributions in numerical linear algebra, control theory, and model reduction".

References

1951 births
Living people
20th-century German mathematicians
German women mathematicians
Bielefeld University alumni
Academic staff of the University of Bremen
Fellows of the Society for Industrial and Applied Mathematics
21st-century German mathematicians
20th-century German women
21st-century German women